Nicolas Makelberge is a Swedish artist based in Prague, Czech Republic. His work spans visual art, music and the world of interiors.

His artworks are represented in private collections in Sweden, USA, Mexico, Czech Republic and Germany, and featured in interior design publications such as Harper’s Bazaar, ELLE Decoration and Dolce Vita. Along with his wife he runs a gallery studio Médecine Interiors specializing in curating high-end antiques, modern art and artisanal design.
Art/ Website

Nicolas' music has been nominated for various music awards in his native Sweden including the national radio awards for the 2006 album "Dying in Africa", a collaboration with Johan Tuvesson from Swedish pop duo Karl x Johan.

Discography
 2018 – Confessions (EP, DEO Records)
 2013 – Born From The Sun (EP, Emotion)
 2010 – The Unforgettable Planet (Album, Emotion)
 2006 – Dying in Africa (Album, Rico)
 2006 – "Dying in Africa" (Single, Rico)
 2005 – South America (EP, Bedroom)

Remixes / Collabs 
 2021 – Nicolas Makelberge & Kalle J - Phyllis
 2020 – Kalle J - Korn av guld (Nicolas Makelberge Remix)
 2015 – Nina K - Air (Believe in Asians)
 2014 – Fimbria - Forgiveness (Nicolas Makelberge Remix)
 2012 – Picture - Everything Time (Nicolas Makelberge Remix)
 2011 – Lake Heartbeat - Watch The World Go By (Nicolas Makelberge Remix)
 2010 – Nottee - Don't Waste Your Light On Me (Nicolas Makelberge Remix)
 2009 – Loredana - Rain Rain (Nicolas Makelberge Remix)
 2007 – Friday Bridge - It Girl (Nicolas Makelberge Remix)

Media / Awards 
In 2019 Swedish music magazine Synth.nu referred to the Confessions EP as "instrumental, electronic music created with hardware and a lot of heart".

In 2014, The Guardian listed the single "Dying in Africa" (a collaboration with Johan Tuvesson form Karl x Johan) as one of 10 best dance tracks out of Scandinavia.

In 2013 NY lifestyle magazine Fader referred to Nicolas Makelberge as "Probably the planet's most underrated producer".

In 2011, the follow-up record to Dying in Africa, The Unforgettable Planet, mostly an instrumental album was once again nominated at independent music makers awards, Manifestgalan in Sweden.

In 2006, Makelberge's album Dying in Africa was nominated for the P3 Guld at Swedish national radio awards and Manifestgalan in the category of pop music.

Sonic Magazine listed Dying in Africa as one of the best of 2006.

Makelberge previously released records on Rico and Emotion.

References

Swedish musical groups